The 1991 IBF World Championships (World Badminton Championships) were held in Copenhagen, Denmark in 1991. Following the results of the mixed doubles.

Main stage

Section 1

Section 2

Section 3

Section 4

Final stage

References
http://www.tournamentsoftware.com/sport/events.aspx?id=D35444A5-8F1F-4B92-8ACA-39FE076F5602

1991 IBF World Championships
World Championships